Bahar Ab or Baharab may refer to:
 Baharab, Hamadan
 Bahar Ab, Ilam

See also
 Ab Bahar